William Gainsborough was a medieval Bishop of Worcester. He was nominated on 22 October 1302 and consecrated on 28 October 1302. He died on 17 September 1307.

He was a Franciscan and had been Minister Provincial (head of the order) in England from 1285-1292

Citations

References

 

Bishops of Worcester
14th-century Italian Roman Catholic bishops
1307 deaths
Year of birth unknown